Pump Boys and Dinettes is a musical written by a performance group of the same name. The group, Pump Boys and Dinettes, consists of John Foley, Mark Hardwick, Debra Monk, Cass Morgan, John Schimmel and Jim Wann. The members directed and starred in the Broadway production.

History
The musical was created by two friends who worked at The Cattleman restaurant in New York City, dramatizing their experiences there. It started as a two-man act and then expanded. As Jim Wann, the show's principal author and composer recalled in 2010,

Productions
The musical premiered on Broadway on February 4, 1982, at the Princess Theatre and closed on June 18, 1983, after 573 performances. The cast featured Debra Monk, Cass Morgan, John Foley, Mark Hardwick and John Schimmel. It had premiered at the Chelsea West Side Arts Theatre on July 10, 1981, moving to the Colonnades Theatre (Greenwich Village) in October 1981.

The show played in London's West End at the Piccadilly Theatre from September 20, 1984, to June 8, 1985, and transferred to the Albery Theatre from June 11, 1985, to September 2, 1985. The production starred, amongst others, Paul Jones, Clodagh Rodgers, Joe Brown, Brian Protheroe, Carlene Carter and Kiki Dee.

The show played for many years in Chicago at the Apollo Theater on Lincoln Avenue.

A 1983 touring version of the show featured former pop star Nicolette Larson. Larson's performance in the show was well-received, and it began a brief foray into country music for her.

On July 16–19, 2014, the show was revived for five performances at New York City Center as part of the Encores! Off-Center program. The cast featured Hunter Foster, Mamie Parris, Randy Redd, Katie Thompson and Jordan Dean.

On July 22, 2018, the original cast (save Mark Hardwick, who died in 1991) performed two full-score concert versions of the show at Feinstein's/54 Below in Manhattan.

The musical tells the story of four men (L.M., Jackson, Jim and Eddie) who work at a gas station and two waitresses (sisters Prudie and Rhetta Cupp) at the Double Cupp Diner, located somewhere between Frog Level and Smyrna, North Carolina. The music is mostly from the country rock/pop music genres. They perform on guitars, piano, bass and kitchen utensils.

The original cast album was released by CBS Records in the U.S. Its recording of "The Night Dolly Parton Was Almost Mine" reached number 67 on the Hot Country Songs charts.

In 2021, Porchlight Music Theatre premiered a new song written by Jim Wann for this Chicago production, "Surf Castin' Man." Porchlight's production was directed by Daryl Brooks, music directed by Robert Reddrick and choreographed by Rueben D. Echoles. "Surf Castin' Man" was performed by Frederick Harris with the cast that also included Rafe Bradford, Shantel Cribbs, Ian Paul Custer, Melanie Loren and Billy Rude.

Other media
Pump Boys and Dinettes on Television was a pilot episode for a series adaptation of the show featuring the Broadway cast and appearances by Ron Carey and Tanya Tucker. It aired on NBC on August 15, 1983, but a series was never ordered.

Songs
Lyrics and music by Jim Wann (unless otherwise noted)

Act I
Highway 57 — Company
Taking It Slow (Music and lyrics by John Foley, Mark Hardwick and John Schimmel) — Pump Boys
Serve Yourself — L.M.
Menu Song (Music and lyrics by Cass Morgan and Debra Monk) — Dinettes
The Best Man — Prudie Cupp
Fisherman's Prayer — Pump Boys
Caution: Men Cooking (Music and lyrics by Cass Morgan, Debra Monk and John Foley) — Pump Boys
Mamaw — Jim
Be Good or Be Gone — Rhetta Cupp
Drinkin' Shoes (Music and lyrics by Cass Morgan, Debra Monk and Mark Hardwick) — Company

Act II
Pump Boys — Pump Boys
Mona — Jackson
T.N.D.P.W.A.M. (The Night Dolly Parton Was Almost Mine) — L.M.
Tips (Music and lyrics by Cass Morgan and Debra Monk) — Dinettes
Sister (Music and lyrics by Cass Morgan) — Dinettes
Vacation — Company
No Holds Barred (Music and lyrics by Cass Morgan) — Company
Farmer Tan — L.M. and Dinettes
Highway 57 (Reprise) — Company
Closing Time — Company

Awards and nominations

Original Broadway production

Notes

External links
 
 
 History and background
 Synopsis at Guide to Musical Theatre
 Pump Boys and Dinettes revived in New York in 2011 by Numero Uno Productions

1981 musicals
Broadway musicals
Plays set in North Carolina
West End musicals